North Lombard Transit Center is a light rail station on the MAX Yellow Line in Portland, Oregon. It is the 7th stop northbound on the Interstate MAX extension.

The station is located in the median of Interstate Avenue near the intersection with N Lombard Street. It has staggered side platforms, which sit on either side of the cross street, because the route runs around this station on Interstate Avenue in the median. Mosaic tiles at the station and bus shelters refer to workers and transportation.

Bus line connections
This station is served by the following bus lines:
4 - Fessenden
75 - Cesar Chavez/Lombard

See also
 List of TriMet transit centers

References

External links
N. Lombard Transit Center – TriMet page
Station information (with northbound ID number) from TriMet
Station information (with southbound ID number) from TriMet

MAX Light Rail stations
MAX Yellow Line
Railway stations in the United States opened in 2004
TriMet transit centers
2004 establishments in Oregon
North Portland, Oregon
Arbor Lodge, Portland, Oregon
Railway stations in Portland, Oregon
Bus stations in Portland, Oregon